Handaya is a 1979 Sri Lankan Sinhala black-n-white children's film directed and produced by Titus Thotawatte for Thotawatte Salaroo. The film is cited as a legend in Sinhala cinema history. It stars many child actors along with Henry Jayasena, J.H.Jayawardana and Pearl Wasudevi in lead roles along with U. Ariyavimal and Gemunu Wijesuriya. Music composed by Somapala Rathnayake. It is the 434th Sri Lankan film in the Sinhala cinema.

The film received mainly positive reviews from critics and awarded in many local and international film festivals. Handaya received 8.8 of ratings from IMDb database.

Background
Before screening in film halls, the film was screened few times for children orphanages around the country. The premiere screening of the film was celebrated on 2 November 1979 on 10am onward at the Savoy Cinema Hall with the presence of prime minister Ranasinghe Premadasa and lady Hema Premadasa. Film was released to public on 16 November 1979 on 6.30pm at Majestic Cinema with the presence of whole film crew. Film completed the showtime nearly for 150 days around 15 cinema halls of the fifth board.

Television release
The film was telecasted on Rupavahini on every Saturday from 7 to 7.30pm as a six episode film.

Plot

Cast
 U. Ariyavimal as Yousuf Nana
 Fantalian De Soysa as Thadi Piya
 G.B. Ilangakoon as Doctor
 Henry Jayasena as Mr. Perera
 P.G. Jayawardana as Teacher
 J.H. Jayawardena as Marshall
 Jayalath Manoratne as Commentator
 Karunaratne Abeysekera as Commentator
 Ivoen Panditharathna as Judge
 Rekha Samaratunga as Layisa	
 Pearl Vasudevi as Suzee Akka		
 Gamini Wickramanayake	as Kota
 Gemunu Wijesuriya as Abaran
 Bandara K. Wijethunga as Double Kolama 
 Ranjith Yainna as Serpinu
 Daya Alwis as Commentator box viewer

Child cast
 Pradeep Roshan Fernando as Sena (Lead)
 Kithsirimevan Jayasena as Sooppuwa (Lead)
 Dharshana Panangala as Ukkuwa	 
 Kasun Madurasingha as Chutte	
 Viranga Indunil Galpihilla as Sister
 Sanjaya Abeygunawardana as Giya		
 Sunny Nawagaththegama as Jine
 Shanthapriya de Silva as Sooppuwa's friend
 Nimal Kingsly Wijesingha as Anta	 
 Muditha Ranasingha as Bolaya	
 Ekiyan Bacho as Tommy
 Suresh Ratnasingham as Sena's Friend

Songs

Awards and accolades
Handaya is the first Sri Lankan film to be awarded at the Italy International Film Festival, which was won in 1980.

 Best Children's Film 1980 at Italy International Film Festival.
 Special Jury Award for the Best Film at Presidential Award Ceremony.
 1980 Sarasaviya Best Director Award
 1980 Sarasaviya Award for the Best Producer
 1980 Sarasaviya Award for the Best Script
 1980 Sarasaviya Award for the Best Editor
 1980 Sarasaviya Award for the Best Cinematography
 1980 Sarasaviya Award for the Best Lyrics
 1980 Sarasaviya Award for the Best Supporting Actor
 OCIC Award for the Creative Direction

References

1979 films
1970s Sinhala-language films